Joseph Burns (March 11, 1800 – May 12, 1875) was a U.S. Representative from Ohio.

Born in Waynesboro, Virginia, Burns moved to Ohio with his parents in 1815. Where they initially settled in New Philadelphia in 1815. Later moving to Coshocton, Coshocton County, in 1816.
He attended the urban schools.
He was engaged in industrial pursuits.
He was the Auditor of Coshocton County from 1821 to 1838.
He served as member of the State House of Representatives 1838–1840.
County clerk 1843–1851.
He served as a major general in the State militia.
He was a Presidential elector in 1848 for Cass/Butler.

Burns was elected as a Democrat to the Thirty-fifth Congress (March 4, 1857 – March 3, 1859).
He was an unsuccessful candidate for reelection in 1858 to the Thirty-sixth Congress.
He was engaged in the drug business in Coshocton, Ohio.
Probate judge of Coshocton County.
He died in Coshocton, Ohio, on May 12, 1875.
He was interred in Oak Ridge Cemetery.

References

Sources

1800 births
1876 deaths
People from Coshocton, Ohio
People from Waynesboro, Virginia
1848 United States presidential electors
Democratic Party members of the Ohio House of Representatives
Democratic Party members of the United States House of Representatives from Ohio
American militia generals
19th-century American politicians